The television series This Is Us has won various awards throughout its run.

Accolades

Notes

References

External links

This Is Us
This Is Us